Narrgnistor 2, En halv böj blues och andra ballader, rätten till ett eget liv (English: Foolishnesses 2, A halv-bend blues and other ballads) is a music album recorded by the Swedish-Dutch folk singer-songwriter Cornelis Vreeswijk in 1978.

Track listing
"Ballad om hurusom Don Quijote gick på en blåsning"
"Nalle Puhs getinghonung"
"Åh, va jag var lycklig i natt"
"Balladen om den väpnade tiggaren"
"Hej, hå!"
"Kors, vad fest i denna byn"
"Leka med elden"
"En halv böj blues"
"Fagermans visa"
"Ballad till en bra polis"
"'Håll Sverige rent', sa polaren Per"
"Ballad om en gammal knarkare"
"Sången om Britt"
"Fredrik Åkares morgonpsalm"

References

Cornelis Vreeswijk albums
1978 albums